Pieter Carel Cornelis "Piet" van der Touw (born 29 November 1940) is a retired Dutch cyclist. He competed at the 1960 and 1964 Summer Olympics in five events in total. He finished in fourth place three times: twice in the 1000 m time trial (1960 and 1964) and once in the 2000 m tandem sprint. Nationally, he finished third in the sprint in 1966, 1976 and 1977. He was also an accomplished road cyclist and in 1965 won a six-day road race in Melbourne.

See also
 List of Dutch Olympic cyclists

References

1940 births
Living people
Dutch male cyclists
Cyclists at the 1960 Summer Olympics
Cyclists at the 1964 Summer Olympics
Olympic cyclists of the Netherlands
People from Rijswijk
Cyclists from South Holland